The Most Exalted Order of the National Hero is an Antiguan and Barbudan order of chivalry recognising pre-eminently distinguished service to Antigua and Barbuda or to humanity at large. The present Order was established and constituted by the Parliament of Antigua and Barbuda under the National Honours Act 1998. which received Royal Assent from the Governor General of Antigua and Barbuda on 31 December 1998.

History 
The Order of the National Hero was first established and constituted by the Parliament of Antigua and Barbuda under the National Heroes Act 1994. This Act was repealed and the Order was re-established and re-constituted under the National Honours Act 1998, which was amended in 2000, 2001 and 2015. Persons who were members of the Order before the 1998 Act came into force became Knights or Dames Companion of Order.

Composition 
The Order is composed of the Sovereign, Chancellor and one single class of Knights Companion (KNH) or Dames Companion (DNH).

The Governor General of Antigua and Barbuda is ex officio Chancellor of the Order. Membership is open to only citizens of Antigua and Barbuda and there may be no more than three living members at any one time.

Officers 
The Order has four officers who compose the Chancery of the Order, as follows:
 Chancellor
 Secretary General
 Antigua Herald
 Barbuda Herald

Appointments 
Appointments to the Order are made by the Chancellor on the advice of the Prime Minister of Antigua and Barbuda and the Honours Committee established under the 1998 Act. The Honours Committee consists of a person appointed by the Governor General of Antigua and Barbuda, two Members of the Senate of Antigua and Barbuda and four Members of the House of Representatives of Antigua and Barbuda. The Governor General appoints the Chairperson of the Honours Committee from amongst its members.

Posthumous appointments to the Order may be made, but a deceased recipient does not appear on the current list of members of the Order.

New appointments are announced on the occasion of the Independence Day of Antigua and Barbuda (1 November). The Grand Master conducts investitures at Government House in St John's.

Precedence and privileges

Titles 
In Antigua and Barbuda, Knights Companion of the Order may use the title "Sir" in front of their forename, and their wives may use the title "Lady" in front of their husband's surname. Similarly, Dames Companion of the Order may use the title "Dame" in front of their forename. No specific privilege exists for their husbands.

Permission to use these titles outside Antigua and Barbuda is the prerogative of each relevant jurisdiction. For instance, British citizens, including dual citizens, who are Knights and Dames of non-British orders of chivalry may not as a matter of official policy use their titles in the United Kingdom.

Post-nominals and precedence 
Members of the Order are entitled to place post-nominals after their names as indicated above. They are also assigned a place in the order of precedence of Antigua and Barbuda.

Heraldic privileges 
Knights and Dames Companion may petition for heraldic supporters to be granted to their arms. They may also encircle their arms with a circlet bearing the motto of the Order and the pendent insignia of the Order may be shown below the arms.

List of Knights and Dames Companion

See also 
 Order of the Nation (Antigua and Barbuda)
 Order of Merit (Antigua and Barbuda)
 Order of Princely Heritage
 List of post-nominals (Antigua and Barbuda)
 Order and decorations of Commonwealth realms

References 

Orders, decorations, and medals of Antigua and Barbuda
Awards established in 1998
1998 establishments in Antigua and Barbuda